Giovanni Prati (27 January 1815 – 9 May 1884) was an Italian poet and politician.

Prati was born in Dasindo, province of Trento, then part of the Austrian Empire. He was educated in law at Padua. Adopting a literary career, he was inspired by anti-Austrian feeling and devotion to the royal house of Savoy, and in early life his combination of a sympathy for national independence with monarchical sentiments brought him into trouble in both quarters, to the point that Guerrazzi expelled him from Tuscany in 1849 for his praise of Carlo Alberto.  These sentiments also led him to attend the "Salotto Maffei" salons in Milan, hosted by Clara Maffei.

In 1862 he was elected a deputy to the Italian parliament, and in 1876 a senator. He died in Rome on 9 May 1884. Prati was a prolific poet, his volumes of verse ranging from his romantic narrative Ermenegarda (1841) to the lyrics collected in Psiche (1875) and Iside (1878). His Opere vane were published in five volumes in 1875, and a selection in one volume in 1892.

References

Italian poets
Italian male poets
1815 births
1884 deaths
19th-century poets
19th-century Italian male writers